The 2012 Orkney Council election took place on 3 May 2012 to elect members of Orkney Council. The election used the six wards created as a result of the Local Governance (Scotland) Act 2004, with each ward electing three or four Councillors using the single transferable vote system form of proportional representation, with 21 Councillors being elected.

As in 2007 Independents took all of the 21 seats on the Council. The Scottish National Party contested 4 wards in Orkney for the first time in 2012 but only secured 3% of the vote. The Council is again administered solely by Independents.

Election result

Note: "Votes" are the first preference votes. The net gain/loss and percentage changes relate to the result of the previous Scottish local elections on 3 May 2007. This may differ from other published sources showing gain/loss relative to seats held at dissolution of Scotland's councils.

Ward results

Kirkwall East
2007: 4xIndependent
2012: 4xIndependent
2007-2012 Change: No change

Kirkwall West & Orphir
2007: 4xIndependent
2012: 4xIndependent
2007-2012 Change: No change

Stromness and South Isles
2007: 3xIndependent
2012: 3xIndependent
2007-2012 Change: No change

West Mainland
2007: 4xIndependent
2012: 4xIndependent
2007-2012 Change: No change

East Mainland, South Ronaldsay and Burray
2007: 3xIndependent
2012: 3xIndependent
2007-2012 Change: No change

North Isles
2007: 3xIndependent
2012: 3xIndependent
2007-2012 Change: No Change

Post-Election Changes
† Kirkwall West and Orphir Independent Cllr Jack Moodie resigned his seat for personal reasons on 9 September 2014. A by-election was held on 27 November 2014 and was won by the Independent Leslie Manson. 
†† West Mainland Independent Cllr Alistair Gordon died on 19 May 2015. A by-election was held on 18 August 2015 to fill the vacancy and it was won by the Independent Rachael King.

By-elections

References 

https://web.archive.org/web/20120608070718/http://www.orkney.gov.uk/Council/C/results-by-ward.htm

2012 Scottish local elections
2012
21st century in Orkney